Radiotelevisión del Principado de Asturias (RTPA) is a public broadcasting company within the Asturias created in 2005. Since 2011, its general director is Antonio Virgili.

History
Televisión del Principado de Asturias made its first test broadcast on 20 December 2005 at 21:00. On 7 January 2006, TPA broadcast its first sports coverage with a football match between Sporting de Gijón and Racing de Ferrol, although the match was provided by Televisión de Galicia. The next day, another football game was broadcast, this time at Gozón between Marino de Luanco and Cultural de Durango, but this time produced by themselves. During the first months, all the weekend games of Sporting de Gijón, Marino de Luanco and Real Oviedo were broadcast.

On 6 June 2006, TPA started regular broadcasts with news broadcasting. On September that year, RTPA started radio service tests and broadcasts via satellite through Hispasat.

The Radio del Principado de Asturias started regular broadcastings on 21 December 2007.

Divisions
Televisión del Principado de Asturias
Televisión del Principado de Asturias 2
Radio del Principado de Asturias

References

External links 

RTPA.es

 
Asturias
Spanish radio networks
Television networks in Spain
FORTA
Asturian-language television stations
Television channels and stations established in 2005
Mass media companies established in 2005
2005 establishments in Spain